The Best is the first Japanese compilation album by South Korean girl group Girls' Generation. It was released on July 23, 2014, in Japan through EMI Records Japan. The album was released in three different editions, regular and two limited, with the latter containing a DVD or Blu-ray, an extra CD and a photobook. The album originally contains all of the group's previous Japanese singles, while including a previously-unreleased Japanese version of "Mr.Mr." and an original track, titled "Indestructible".

A new edition titled The Best (New Edition) was released on October 15, 2014. The album was released in two editions, standard and a CD+DVD, with the latter containing five new songs, two previously-released Japanese versions and three new songs, "Chain Reaction", "Show Girls" and the single "Divine". Upon its release, The Best attained commercial success for the girl group, becoming their third, and to date, final chart-topper on the Oricon Albums Chart.

Background and release
On July 23, The Best topped the Japan's Oricon daily music chart, selling more than 37,000 copies. After the 1st week, the album sold more than 75,000 copies, topping the weekly chart as well. The group, as a result of this achievement, has set a new record to become the first non-Japanese female group in Asia to ever have three Japanese albums, along with Girls' Generation (2011) and Love & Peace (2013), scoring 1st place on the chart. The album spent two weeks at number one on the Oricon chart, and has sold more than 175,000 copies by the end of the year. It is, to date, the group's final Japanese major release, and subsequently the group's last overall release to feature member Jessica before her departure from the group on September 30, 2014.

New songs
"Indestructible", released as a promotional single, was produced by Claire Rodrigues, Albi Albertsson, Chris Meyer, and written by Kamikaoru.  Lyrically, the pop ballad talks about the indestructible relationship that two people, who are in love, share  with each other, implying similar sentiments that Girls' Generation feels with one another as well as with their fans. "This indestructible, unbreakable bond that can never be broken/Our soul is a twin soul (twin soul)/For example, even if it looks like you’re about to fall from a cliff/At least know that I won’t let go of your hand."  The song was showcased for the first time as a lyric music video during Girls' Generation's last stop of their third Japan tour in Tokyo between July 11–13, 2014. The music video was subsequently officially released on August 1, 2014.

"Divine", released as the second promotional single, and was produced by Stephan Elfgren, Albi Albertsson, Sean Alexander and written by Kamikaoru, There were two versions for the accompanied music video. The first version, featured with a background story, was released on September 29, 2014. The second version, featured the appearances of Girls' Generation members, was released on October 14, 2014. This is also the last official single and music video featuring former member Jessica.

"Chain Reaction", was written by Kesha, E. Kidd Bogart, Michael Busbee, and Michael Brooks Linney. It was first produced for Kesha but later was sold to Girls' Generation.

Promotion and live performances

Tokyo Dome concert
To commemorate their fourth anniversary debut in Japan, the group held a concert titled "Girls' Generation "The Best Live" at Tokyo Dome". It was announced on August 25, 2014, by SM Entertainment that Girls' Generation will hold a concert commemorating their fourth anniversary debut in Japan at Tokyo Dome. Girls' Generation became the second K-pop girl group after Kara to hold a concert there. The concert gathered an audience of 50,000 attendees. This is the first concert without former member Jessica, who left the group on September 30, 2014.

Set list

Concert date

DVD release

Girls' Generation "The Best Live" at Tokyo Dome was released on April 1, 2015, on DVD and Blu-ray, it is the eleventh release from Girls' Generation. Both versions included live footage and a 100-page photobook.

Track listing

Charts and certifications

Weekly charts

Year-end charts

Certifications

Release history

References

External links 
 
 

Girls' Generation albums
2014 greatest hits albums
Universal Records compilation albums
SM Entertainment compilation albums
Japanese-language compilation albums